Aleksandra Andreyevna Vorobyova (born 24 December 1989) is a Russian singer.

On 26 December 2014 she won the Russian reality television singing competition Golos, based on The Voice series, with the other finalist Yaroslav Dronov coming as runner-up. In the final round she got near 55% of votes. She was coached by the Russian composer Alexander Gradsky.

References

1989 births
Russian pop singers
Living people
People from Engels, Saratov Oblast
The Voice (franchise) winners
21st-century Russian singers
21st-century Russian women singers